Erinna may refer to:
 Erinna, the Greek poet
 Erinna (gastropod), a genus of a freshwater snail
 Erinna (plant), a plant genus